Westernization (or Westernisation), also Europeanisation or occidentalization (from the Occident), is a process whereby societies come under or adopt Western culture in areas such as industry, technology, science, education, politics, economics, lifestyle, law, norms, mores, customs, traditions, values, mentality, perceptions, diet, clothing, language, writing system, religion, and philosophy. During colonialism it often involved the spread of Christianity.

Westernization has been a growing influence across the world in the last few centuries, with some thinkers assuming Westernization to be the equivalent of modernization, a way of thought that is often debated. The overall process of Westernization is often two-sided in that Western influences and interests themselves are joined with parts of the affected society, at minimum, to become a more Westernized society, with the putative goal of attaining a Western life or some aspects of it, while Western societies are themselves affected by this process and interaction with non-Western groups.

Westernization traces its roots back to Ancient Greece. Later, the Roman Empire took on the first process of Westernization as it was heavily influenced by Greece and created a new culture based on the principles and values of the Ancient Greek society. The Romans emerged with a culture that grew into a new Western identity based on the Greco-Roman society.

Westernization can also be compared to acculturation and enculturation. Acculturation is "the process of cultural and psychological change that takes place as a result of contact between cultural groups and their individual members." After contact, changes in cultural patterns are evident within one or both cultures. Specific to Westernization and the non-Western culture, foreign societies tend to adopt changes in their social systems relative to Western ideology, lifestyle, and physical appearance, along with numerous other aspects, and shifts in culture patterns can be seen to take root as a community becomes acculturated to Western customs and characteristics – in other words, Westernized.

The phenomenon of Westernization does not follow any one specific pattern across societies as the degree of adaption and fusion with Western customs will occur at varying magnitudes within different communities. Specifically, the extent to which domination, destruction, resistance, survival, adaptation, or modification affect a native culture may differ following inter-ethnic contact.

Western world

The "West" was originally defined as the Western world. A thousand years later, the East-West Schism separated the Catholic Church and Eastern Orthodox Church from each other. The definition of Western changed as the West was influenced by and spread to other nations. Islamic and Byzantine scholars added to the Western canon when their stores of Greek and Roman literature jump-started the Renaissance. The Cold War also reinterpreted the definition of the West by excluding the countries of the former Eastern Bloc. Today, most modern uses of the term refer to the societies in the West and their close genealogical, linguistic, and philosophical descendants. Typically included are those countries whose ethnic identity and dominant culture are derived from Western European culture. Though it shares a similar historical background, the Western world is not a monolithic bloc, as many cultural, linguistic, religious, political, and economic differences exist between Western countries and populations.

Significantly influenced countries

The following countries or regions experienced a significant influence by the process of Westernization:
Armenia: Geographically located in the Caucasus region of West Asia, Armenia's culture has been increasingly influenced by the process of Westernization. Throughout its history, Armenia has been influenced by Western and Eastern civilizations. Armenia became the first state in the world to adopt Christianity as its official religion in 301 AD. The traditional Armenian homeland composed of Eastern Armenia and Western Armenia came under the rule of the Roman, Persian, Arab, Ottoman, and Russian empires. Current Armenia gained its independence in 1991, following the collapse of the Soviet Union. Today, the Government of Armenia maintains positive relations with Iran, Russia, and the West, including the United States and the EU. The country participates in various organizations linked to the EU, such as the Eastern Partnership, the Euronest Parliamentary Assembly and is a member of the Council of Europe, the OSCE, the BSEC, La Francophonie, and NATO's Partnership for Peace and Euro-Atlantic Partnership Council. In 2017, Armenia signed an extensive agreement with the EU; the CEPA agreement further strengthens economic and political ties. Armenia is also a member of various European organisations for sports, education, and cultural events such as UEFA, the European Olympic Committees, and the European Higher Education Area, and participates in the Eurovision Song Contest.
Azerbaijan: Geographically located in the Caucasus mountain range (natural border between Western Asia and Eastern Europe). Azerbaijan borrowed Western traditions mainly as a result of imperial Russian influence, with the Muslim world's first opera and secular democracy being established there before its invasion by the Soviets. Currently, the country participates in various European organizations including the EU's Eastern Partnership, the Council of Europe, and GUAM. It is also a member of European organisations for sports such as UEFA and the European Olympic Committees, and regularly participates in the Eurovision Song Contest. Despite this, the country remains an authoritarian regime with considerable human rights and press freedom issues.
Cape Verde: An insular country in West Africa, Cape Verde has influences of European culture (particularly Portuguese) and, together with the Azores and Madeira (Portugal), and the Canary Islands (Spain), it is part of the archipelagos of Macaronesia. Due to this, the country has shared close diplomatic and cultural relations with both Iberian countries and has even tried to approach Western organizations, like the EU and NATO.
Hong Kong, Macau, and Singapore: Despite their geographical positions in East and Southeast Asia and Chinese heritage, due to the heavy influences of European heritage (particularly British and Portuguese) culture, the three territories are at-least partially westernized.
Israel: Although Israel is geographically located in Western Asia, many Western cultural influences were brought in Israel by Jewish returnees from the diaspora, particularly countries like Canada, France, Germany, the United Kingdom, and the United States. It is a member of the OECD. It is often a member of European organisations for sports and cultural events such as UEFA and Eurovision, which is due in large part to Israel's ouster from their respective Asian counterparts. According to Sammy Smooha, a professor emeritus of sociology at Haifa University, Israel is described as a "hybrid," a modern and developed "semi-Western" state. With time, he acknowledged, Israel will become "more and more Western." But as a result of the ongoing Arab–Israeli conflict, full Westernization will be a slow process in Israel.
Japan, South Korea, and Taiwan: Although they are geographically located in East Asia, the three  countries have westernized themselves since the Meiji Era (in the Empire of Japan, including the Korea and Taiwan), have democratic forms of government (although both South Korea and Nationalist China were formerly anti-communist authoritarian states), free market economic systems, high standards of living and major contributions to Western science and technology, and could be described as "hybrid," modern and developed "semi-Western" states. Several United States Army bases are stationed in the three countries. Both countries have also shared a historically very close link with the countries of Europe and with the EU.
Latin America: Most countries in Latin America are considered Western countries, largely because most of its peoples are descended from Europeans (Spanish and Portuguese settlers and later immigration from other European nations), and their society operates in a highly Westernized way. Most Latin American countries use either Spanish or Portuguese as their official language. According to the CIA World Factbook, there has also been considerable immigration to Latin America, particularly to Argentina, Brazil, Chile, and Uruguay, from European nations other than Spain and Portugal (for example, from Germany, Italy, the Netherlands, etc.—see Immigration to Argentina, Immigration to Brazil, Immigration to Chile, and Immigration to Uruguay).
Philippines: Geographically located in Southeast Asia, due to heavy influences of European (particularly Spanish) and American cultures in Filipino culture, the country is considered Westernized. Moreover, nearly 90% of the Filipino population practices Christianity.
Thailand: Although Thailand is geographically located in Southeast Asia, through the 18th and 19th centuries, Siam faced imperialist pressure from France and the United Kingdom, including many unequal treaties with Western powers and forced concessions of territory; it nevertheless remained the only Southeast Asian country to avoid direct Western colonization. The country became westernized by itself, the Siamese system of government was centralized and initially organized into a modern unitary absolute monarchy during the reign of Chulalongkorn, later as a constitutional monarchy following the Siamese revolution of 1932. In the late 1950s, Thailand became a major ally of the United States, and played a key anti-communist role in the region as a member of the SEATO. Currently, Thailand continues to have strong ties to Western countries.
Turkey: Although geographically only 3% of Turkey lies in Europe (East Thrace) and the rest in Western Asia, Turkey is one of the most Westernized Turkic countries. The country has a similar economic system, has a customs union with the European Union in addition to being an official candidate for membership, and is a member of traditional European & Western organisations such as the OECD, the Council of Europe, and NATO. It is also a member of European organisations for sports such as UEFA and the European Olympic Committees, and has participated in the Eurovision Song Contest. Relations between Turkey and Western countries have been deteriorating since the 2010s.

Views

Kishore Mahbubani
Kishore Mahbubani's book entitled The Great Convergence: Asia, the West, and the Logic of One World (Public Affairs), is very optimistic.  It proposes that a new global civilization is being created. The majority of non-Western countries admire and adhere to Western living standards. It says this newly emerging global order has to be ruled through new policies and attitudes. He argues that policymakers all over the world must change their preconceptions and accept that we live in one world. The national interests must be balanced with global interests and the power must be shared. Mahbubani urges that only through these actions can we create a world that converges benignly.

Samuel P. Huntington posits a conflict between "the West and the Rest" and offers three forms of general action that non-Western civilizations can react toward Western countries.
 Non-Western countries can attempt to achieve isolation to preserve their own values and protect themselves from Western invasion. He argues that the cost of this action is high and only a few states can pursue it.
 According to the theory of "band-wagoning" non-Western countries can join and accept Western values.
 Non-Western countries can make an effort to balance Western power through modernization. They can develop economic, and military power and cooperate with other non-Western countries against the West while still preserving their own values and institutions.

Mahbubani counters this argument in his other book, The New Asian Hemisphere: The Irresistible Shift of Global Power to the East. This time, he argues that Western influence is now "unraveling", with Eastern powers such as China arising. He states:
 He explains the decline of Western influence, stating reasons as to the loss of Western credibility with the rest of the world.
 There is an increasing perception that Western countries will prioritize their domestic problems over international issues, despite their spoken and written promises of having global interests and needs.
 The West has become increasingly biased and close-minded in their perception of "non-Western" countries such as China, declaring it an "un-free" country for not following a democratic form of government. 
 The West uses a double standard when dealing with international issues. 
 As the biggest Eastern populations gain more power, they are moving away from the Western influences they sought after in the past. The "anti-Americanism" sentiment is not temporary, as Westerners like to believe – the change in the Eastern mindset has become far too significant for it to change back.

Samuel P. Huntington
In contrast to territorial delineation, others, like the American political scientist Samuel P. Huntington (see The Clash of Civilizations), consider what is "Western" based on religious affiliation, such as deeming the majority-Western Christian part of Europe and North America the West, and creating 6 other civilizations, including Latin America, Confucian, Japanese, Islamic, Hindu and Slavic-Orthodox, to organize the rest of the globe.

Huntington claimed that after the end of the cold war, world politics had been moved into a new aspect in which non-Western civilizations were no more the exploited recipients of Western civilization but become another important actor joining the West to shape and move the world history.

Huntington believed that while the age of ideology had ended, the world had only reverted to a normal state of affairs characterized by cultural conflict. In his thesis, he argued that the primary axis of conflict in the future will be along cultural and religious lines.

Edward Said
In Orientalism Edward Said views Westernization as it occurred in the process of colonization, an exercise of essentializing a "subject race" in order to more effectively dominate them. Said references Arthur Balfour, the British Prime Minister from 1902 to 1905, who regarded the rise of nationalism in Egypt in the late 19th century as counterproductive to a "benevolent" system of occupational rule. Balfour frames his argument in favor of continued rule over the Egyptian people by appealing to England's great "understanding" of Egypt's civilization and purporting that England's cultural strengths complemented and made them natural superiors to Egypt's racial deficiencies. Regarding this claim, Said says, "Knowledge to Balfour means surveying a civilization from its origins to its prime to its decline – and of course, it means being able to...The object of such knowledge is inherently vulnerable to scrutiny; this object is a ‘fact' which, if it develops, changes, or otherwise transforms itself...[the civilization] nevertheless is fundamentally, even ontologically stable. To have such knowledge of such a thing is to dominate it." The act of claiming coherent knowledge of a society in effect objectifies and others it into marginalization, making people who are classified into that race as "almost everywhere nearly the same." Said also argues that this relationship to the "inferior" races, in fact, works to also fortify and make coherent what is meant by "the West"; if "The Oriental is irrational, depraved (fallen), childlike, "different..." then "...the European is rational, virtuous, mature, normal." Thus, "the West" acts as a construction in the similar way as does "the Orient" – it is a created notion to justify a particular set of power relations, in this case, the colonization and rule of a foreign country.

Process

Colonization (1400s–1970s)

Europeanization
From the 1400s onward, Europeanization and colonialism spread gradually over much of the world and controlled different regions during this five centuries long period, colonizing or subjecting the majority of the globe.
Following World War II, Western leaders and academics sought to expand innate liberties and international equality. A period of decolonization began. At the end of the 1960s, most colonies were allowed autonomy. Those new states often adopted some aspects of Western politics such as a constitution, while frequently reacting against Western culture.

In Asia

General reactions to Westernization can include fundamentalism, protectionism, or embrace to varying degrees. Countries such as Korea and China attempted to adopt a system of isolationism but have ultimately juxtaposed parts of Western culture into their own, often adding original and unique social influences, as exemplified by the introduction of over 1,300 locations of the traditionally Western fast-food chain McDonald's into China. Specific to Taiwan, the industry of bridal photography (see Photography in Taiwan) has been significantly influenced by the Western idea of "love". As examined by author Bonnie Adrian, Taiwanese bridal photos of today provide a striking contrast to past accepted norms, contemporary couples often displaying great physical affection and, at times, placed in typically Western settings to augment the modernity, in comparison to the historically prominent relationship, often stoic and distant, exhibited between bride and groom. Though Western concepts may have initially played a role in creating this cultural shift in Taiwan, the market and desire for bridal photography has not continued without adjustments and social modifications to this Western notion.

In Korea, the first contact with Westernization was during the Chosun Dynasty, in the 17th century. Every year, the emperor dispatched a few envoy ambassadors to China and while they were staying in Beijing, the Western missionaries were there. Through the missionaries, Korean ambassadors were able to adopt Western technology. In the 19th century, Korea started to send ambassadors to the foreign countries, other than Japan and China. While Korea was being Westernized slowly in the late 19th century, Korea had the idea of "Eastern ways and Western frames (東道西器)", meaning that they accepted the Western "bowl", but used it with Eastern principles inside.

In Japan, the Netherlands continued to play a key role in transmitting Western know-how to the Japanese from the 17th century to the mid-19th century, because the Japanese had only opened their doors to Dutch merchants before US Navy Commodore Matthew Perry's visit in 1853. After Commodore Perry's visit, Japan began to deliberately accept Western culture to the point of hiring Westerners to teach Western customs and traditions to the Japanese starting in the Meiji era. Since then, many Japanese politicians have encouraged the Westernization of Japan with the use of the term Datsu-A Ron, which means the argument for "leaving Asia" or "Good-bye Asia". In Datsu-A Ron, "Westernization" was described as an "unavoidable" but "fruitful" change. In contrast, despite many advances in industrial efficiency, Japan has sustained a culture of strict social hierarchy and limited individualization.

In Iran, the process of Westernization dates back to the country's attempt to westernize during the beginning of the 1930s, which was dictated by Shah Rezā Khan and continued by his son during the Cold War and agitated the largely conservative Shia Muslim masses of the country, was partly responsible for the 1979 Iranian Revolution.

In Turkey, the synchronization process with the West is known as the Tanzimat (reorganization) period. The Ottoman Empire began to change itself according to modern science, practice, and culture. The Empire took some innovations from the West. Also, with the contribution of foreign engineers, the Empire repaired its old arm systems. Newly-found schools, permanent ambassadors, and privy councils were an essential improvement for the Empire. As a result, Turkey is one of the most Westernized majority-Muslim nations.

Globalization (1970s–present)
Westernization is often regarded as a part of the ongoing process of globalization. This theory proposes that Western thought has led to globalisation, and that globalisation propagates Western culture, leading to a cycle of Westernization. On top of largely Western government systems such as democracy and constitution, many Western technologies and customs like music, clothing, and cars have been introduced across various parts of the world and copied and created in traditionally non-Western countries.

Westernization has been reversed in some countries following war or regime change. For example: China excluding Taiwan after 1949, Cuba after the Revolution in 1959, South Vietnam after the communist takeover in 1975, Afghanistan after the Soviet invasion, and Iran after the 1979 revolution.

The main characteristics are economic and political (free trade) democratisation, combined with the spread of an individualised culture. Often it was regarded as opposite to the worldwide influence of communism. After the break-up of the USSR in late 1991 and the end of the Cold War, many of its component states and allies nevertheless underwent Westernization, including privatization of hitherto state-controlled industry.

With debates still going on, the question of whether globalization can be characterized as Westernization can be seen in various aspects. Globalization is happening in various aspects, ranging from economics, politics, and even food or culture. Westernization, to some schools, is seen as a form of globalization that leads the world to be similar to Western powers. Being globalized means taking positive aspects of the world, but globalization also brings the debate about being Westernized. Democracy, fast food, and American pop culture can all be examples that are considered as Westernization of the world.

According to the "Theory of the Globe scrambled by Social network: a new Sphere of Influence 2.0", published by Jura Gentium (University of Florence), the increasing role of Westernization is characterized by social media. The comparison with Eastern societies, who decided to ban American social media platforms (such as Iran and China with Facebook and Twitter), marks a political desire to avoid the Westernization process of their own populations and ways to communicate.

Consequences

Due to the colonization of the Americas and Oceania by Europeans, the cultural, ethnic, and linguistic make-up of the Americas and Oceania has been changed. This is most visible in settler colonies such as: Australia, Canada, New Zealand, and the United States, and to a lesser extent, in some Latin American countries: Argentina, Brazil, Chile, Costa Rica, and Uruguay, where the traditional indigenous population has been predominantly replaced demographically by non-indigenous settlers due to transmitted disease and conflict. This demographic takeover in settler countries has often resulted in the linguistic, social, and cultural marginalisation of indigenous people. Even in countries where large populations of indigenous people remain or the indigenous peoples have mixed (mestizo) considerably with European settlers, such as: Mexico, Peru, Panama, Suriname, Ecuador, Bolivia, Venezuela, Belize, Paraguay, South Africa, Colombia, Guatemala, Haiti, Honduras, Guyana, El Salvador, Jamaica, Cuba, or Nicaragua, relative marginalisation still exists.

Due to colonization and immigration, the formerly prevalent languages in the Americas, Oceania, and part of South Africa, are now usually Indo-European languages or creoles based on them:
English (Australia, New Zealand, United States, and Canada without mainly French-speaking Quebec); English along with English-based creole languages (Anglophone Africa, Antigua and Barbuda, Bahamas, Barbados, Dominica, Federated States of Micronesia, Fiji, Grenada, Guyana, Hong Kong, India, Jamaica, Kiribati, Marshall Islands, Nauru, Palau, Papua New Guinea, the Philippines, Saint Kitts and Nevis, Saint Lucia, Saint Vincent and the Grenadines, Samoa, Singapore, Solomon Islands, Sri Lanka, Tonga, Tuvalu, and Trinidad and Tobago).
French (Quebec, New Brunswick and parts of Ontario in Canada and Saint Pierre and Miquelon); French along with French-based creole languages (Francophone Africa, French Guiana, Guadeloupe, Haiti, Vanuatu, Martinique, and Saint-Barthelemy).
Spanish (Hispanic America, Equatorial Guinea, Western Sahara, and the Philippines).
Portuguese (Brazil, Lusophone Africa, East Timor, Macau, Goa, and other members of the Community of Portuguese Language Countries).
Dutch along with Creole languages (Suriname, Aruba and the Netherlands Antilles).
Afrikaans along with English (parts of South Africa and Namibia).
German along with Creole languages (along with Afrikaans in Namibia and some areas in the US, such as Pennsylvania (Pennsylvania Dutch))

Many indigenous languages are on the verge of becoming extinct. Some settler countries have preserved indigenous languages; for example, in New Zealand, the Māori language is one of three official languages, the others being English and New Zealand sign language, another example is Ireland, where Irish is the first official language, followed by English as the second official language.

Sports importance in Westernization

The importance of sports partly comes from its connection to Westernization. The insight by Edelman, R., & Wilson, W. (2017) explains “This new system of thought and practices imbued with positive values in the exertion and strategic deployment of the human body, embracing the Anglo-American notion that physical activity was meaningful in and of itself, conducive to values such as learning and character-building. Modern athletics and competitive sports, avatars of this new body culture, elicited largely willing local receptions in North Asia, though there were no doubt isolated cases of coercive foisting better characterized as cultural imperialism.”

See also

 Acculturation
 Anti-globalisation
 Colonial mentality
 Colonialism
 Colonisation
 Cultural assimilation
 Cultural diversity
 Cultural imperialism
 The Culture of Nakedness and the Nakedness of Culture
 Democratisation
 Global citizenship
 Globalisation
 Indigenization
 McDonaldization
 Melting pot
 Modern culture
 Modernization
 Multiculturalism
 Pop culture
 Westernizers – Tsarist Russian advocates of westernization

References

Further reading
 '
 The Decline of the West (1918), written by Oswald Spengler.
 The End of History and the Last Man (1992), written by Francis Fukuyama.
 The Clash of Civilizations (1996), written by Samuel P. Huntington.
 The Triumph of the West (1985) written by Oxford University historian J.M. Roberts.

 

Global culture
Cultural assimilation
Cultural geography
Imperialism
Western culture